Lee Harland (born 4 September 1973) is an English former professional rugby league footballer who played in the 1990s and 2000s.

Playing career

International honours
Lee Harland won caps GB u21 against New Zealand , France , Australian 
Lee Harland won caps for England while at Castleford Tigers in 1999 against France (Rugby league positions) (2 matches).

County honours
Lee Harland won caps for Yorkshire while at Castleford Tigers as a substitute in the 18-22 defeat by Lancashire at Wigan Warriors' stadium on 14 June 2002, and left-, i.e. number 11, in the 56-6 victory over Lancashire at Bradford Bulls' stadium on 2 July 2003.

References

1973 births
Living people
Batley Bulldogs players
Doncaster R.L.F.C. players
Castleford Tigers players
England national rugby league team players
English rugby league players
Halifax R.L.F.C. players
Leeds Rhinos players
Great Britain under-21 national rugby league team players
Rugby league locks
Rugby league second-rows
Yorkshire rugby league team players